The Taekwondo competition at the 2009 Asian Martial Arts Games took place from 2 August to 5 August at the Indoor Stadium Huamark.

Medalists

Men

Women

Medal table

Results

Men

54 kg
2 August

58 kg
3 August

62 kg
4 August

67 kg
5 August

72 kg
5 August

78 kg
4 August

84 kg
3 August

+84 kg
2 August

Women

47 kg
2 August

51 kg
3 August

55 kg
4 August

59 kg
5 August

63 kg
5 August

67 kg
4 August

72 kg
3 August

+72 kg
2 August

References
 Official website – Taekwondo

2009 Asian Martial Arts Games events
Asian Martial Arts Games
2009 Asian Martial Arts Games